Tim Jamieson is an American baseball coach and former catcher, who is the pitching coach for the Memphis Tigers. He played college baseball at New Orleans from 1978 to 1981. He then served as the head coach of the Missouri Tigers (1995–2016). The second winningest coach in school history, Jamieson coached in 3 conferences, and took his teams to 9 NCAA Regionals, winning two conference championships in the process.

Early life
A native of Columbia, Missouri, Jamieson graduated from Rock Bridge High School. Jamieson's father, Dick, played for the New York Titans before serving as the Missouri offensive coordinator under Al Onofrio.

Jamieson went on to attend the University of New Orleans where was a catcher for the New Orleans Privateers baseball team. Jamieson and the Privateers made the NCAA tournament three times and Jamieson was named the team's most valuable player his senior year.

Coaching career
Jamieson's first coaching job was as an assistant coach at his alma mater, the University of New Orleans. While Jamieson was on the staff, the New Orleans Privateers made the NCAA tournament four times in five years and made the 1984 College World Series.  In 1988, Jamieson returned to his hometown as an assistant coach for the Missouri Tigers under Gene McArtor.

When McArtor retired following the 1994 season, Jamieson took over as head coach. In 1996, just his second season as head coach, and Missouri's last in the Big Eight Conference, Jamieson led the Tigers to a conference championship and was named Big 8 Coach of the Year.

From 2003 to 2009, Jamieson led Missouri to seven consecutive NCAA tournaments. In the 2006 NCAA Division I baseball tournament, Missouri won the Malibu regional, becoming the first #4 seed ever to win a regional. In 2007, Jamieson won Big 12 Conference Baseball Coach of the Year honors, leading Missouri to 42 wins and earning a #1 seed and a place as a regional host in the 2007 NCAA Division I baseball tournament.

In 2012, Jamieson led Missouri to its first Big 12 Conference baseball tournament championship. Jamieson had previously led Missouri to the Big 12 Conference baseball tournament Championship Game on three occasions, losing to Oklahoma State in 2004, Texas in 2009, and Texas A&M in 2011.

Jamieson has had 58 players selection in the Major League Baseball Draft, including three first round draft choices in Max Scherzer, Aaron Crow, and Kyle Gibson. Ten Missouri players have earned All-American honors under Jamieson and 30 players have earned All-Conference honors with Aaron Senne earning Big 12 Conference Baseball Player of the Year honors and Max Scherzer and Aaron Crow earning Big 12 Conference Baseball Pitcher of the Year honors.

After the 2016 season, Jamieson resigned from his position as head coach after 28 years at Missouri.

Head coaching record

See also
List of current NCAA Division I baseball coaches

References

External links
 Missouri profile

Year of birth missing (living people)
Living people
Baseball catchers
Memphis Tigers baseball coaches
Missouri Tigers baseball coaches
New Orleans Privateers baseball coaches
New Orleans Privateers baseball players
Southern Illinois Salukis baseball coaches
Sportspeople from Columbia, Missouri